Kazys (shortened from Kazimieras) is a Lithuanian masculine given name and may refer to:

Kazys Abromavičius (born 1928), Lithuanian painter
Kazys Almenas (born 1935), Lithuanian physicist, writer, essayist, and publisher
Kazys Binkis (1893–1942), Lithuanian poet, journalist, and playwright
Kazys Bizauskas (born 1893), Lithuanian statesman, diplomat, author, and one of the twenty signatories of the Act of Independence of Lithuania
Kazys Boruta (1905–1965), Lithuanian writer and poet
Kazys Bradūnas (1917–2009), Lithuanian émigré poet and editor
Kazys Grinius (1866–1950) third President of Lithuania, 1926 to 1926
Kazys Ladiga (1893–1941), Lithuanian General
Kazys Lozoraitis (1929–2007), prominent Lithuanian diplomat and cultural activist
Kazys Petkevičius (1926–2008), Lithuanian basketball player
Kazys Šimonis (1887–1978), Lithuanian painter
Kazys Škirpa (born 1895), Lithuanian military officer and diplomat
Kazys Tallat-Kelpša (1893–1968), Lithuanian military officer
Kazys Varnelis (artist) (1917–2010), abstract painter from Lithuania
Kazys Varnelis (historian) (born 1967), historian and theorist of architecture and network culture

Lithuanian masculine given names